The Hullmaster 27, also called the HM-27, is a Canadian sailboat, that was designed by Edward S. Brewer and Robert Walstrom and first built in 1974. The design is out of production.

Production
The boat was built in Canada by Hullmaster Boats as the Hullmaster 27 and DS Yachts as the HM-27, with 40 examples completed.

Design
The Hullmaster 27 is a small recreational keelboat, built predominantly of fiberglass, with wood trim. It has a masthead sloop rig, a skeg-mounted rudder and a fixed fin keel. It displaces  and carries  of ballast.

The boat has a PHRF racing average handicap of 225 with a high of 222 and low of 231.

See also
List of sailing boat types

Similar sailboats
Aloha 27
Cal 27
Cal 2-27
Cal 3-27
Catalina 27
Catalina 270
Catalina 275 Sport
C&C 27
Crown 28
CS 27
Edel 820
Express 27
Fantasia 27
Halman Horizon
Hotfoot 27
Hunter 27
Hunter 27-2
Hunter 27-3
Irwin 27 
Island Packet 27
Mirage 27 (Perry)
Mirage 27 (Schmidt)
Mirage 275
O'Day 272
Orion 27-2
Tanzer 27
Watkins 27
Watkins 27P

References

External links

Keelboats
1970s sailboat type designs
Sailing yachts
Sailboat type designs by Edward S. Brewer
Sailboat type designs by Robert Walstrom
Sailboat types built by Hullmaster Boats
Sailboat types built by DS Yachts